Sony Ericsson Xperia Neo V is an Android smartphone by Sony Ericsson that supersedes the Sony Ericsson Xperia Neo. It was launched in October 2011 as a cheaper albeit alternative variant of the more expensive Sony Ericsson Xperia Neo. Sony scaled down the camera from 8.1 MP to 5.0 MP in the case of the Neo V so as to keep production costs down.

Hardware 
The Xperia Neo V can be taken as a cheaper, scaled-down version of the Neo, although it has many of the same features found in the Xperia Arc, the Xperia Play and the Sony Ericsson Xperia Neo (including the mobile) Sony Bravia engine. It sports a 5.0-megapixel camera capable of recording 720p high definition video. It also features a front-facing VGA camera excluded from the Xperia Arc which allows for video chat. The graphics on the phone are handled by an Adreno 205.

Reception 
Generally, the phone has received positive reviews from sites such as GSMArena, being praised for its competitive price and the latest (at that time) 2.3 (Gingerbread) upgradeable to 4.0 (Ice Cream Sandwich) Android operating system.

See also
 Galaxy Nexus
 Sony Xperia neo L
 List of Android devices

References

External links
Sony Ericsson

Android (operating system) devices
Sony Ericsson smartphones
Mobile phones introduced in 2011